Zyz or ZYZ may refer to:
 Azizos, ʿzyz in Phoenician, a deity
 , a Ukrainian satirical magazine
 Antwerpen-Berchem railway station, IATA code: ZYZ

See also 
 Zyzz